The maroon woodpecker (Blythipicus rubiginosus) is a species of bird in the family Picidae.
It is found in Brunei, Indonesia, Malaysia, southern Myanmar, Singapore, and southern Thailand.
Its natural habitats are subtropical or tropical moist lowland forests and subtropical or tropical moist montane forests.

References

maroon woodpecker
Birds of Malesia
maroon woodpecker
Taxonomy articles created by Polbot